Qixingyan or Ch'ihsingyen, also known as the Vele Rete rocks, is a group of coral islands in the Bashi Channel, located off the southern coast of Pingtung County, Taiwan. The island group is composed by seven coral reefs. Qixingyan is shaped like the Big Dipper, hence the name "Seven Star Reef". Due to strong currents and shoals in the area, many ships were wrecked and lives lost in the early to mid-19th century after the Qing court opened trade between the West and China. Notable shipwrecks include the 1867 US merchant ship Rover that resulted in the Rover incident and the 1871 Japanese merchant vessel Ryukyu which resulted in the Mudan incident.

See also
 Kenting National Park
 Eluanbi Lighthouse
 List of reefs
 List of Taiwanese superlatives
 List of islands of Taiwan

References

Landforms of Pingtung County
Coral reefs
Reefs of Taiwan